Fix Price is a Russia-based chain of discount variety stores. The chain includes 4,162 stores in Russia, Belarus, Kazakhstan, Uzbekistan, Latvia, Georgia and Kyrgyzstan.

The company was founded by Sergei Lomakin and Artem Khachatryan in 2007, founders and executives of the former Kopeyka (supermarket) chain. Goldman Sachs Group, Inc acquired a stake in the company in 2020.

By the end of 2020, Fixprice had revenue of 190 billion rubles ($2.6 billion) in a year.

In March 2021, Fix Price held an IPO on the London and Moscow stock exchanges. Investors were offered 21% of the authorized capital of the company (178.4 million global depositary receipts at a price of $9.75 each). The company raised about $1.7 billion. The share of each of the co-founders decreased from 41.66% to 35.43%. Selling shareholders still have a put option for another 26.8 million GDRs. Now Fix Price's capitalization is estimated at $8.3 billion. This is the largest listing of a Russian company in ten years. Open trading will begin on March 10.

In September 2021, Samonico Holdings of Marathon group of Alexander Vinokurov disinvested from the capital of Fix Price to sell its 2,98% of shares (25,36 million GDR) with a 10% discount by share of the total of 850 million shares.

References 

Discount stores
Retail companies of Russia